Nicolle Morrell, is a Panamanian model and a pageant titleholder from Ciudad de Panamá, Panamá who was represented the Panamá Centro state in the Bellezas Panamá 2010 pageant, on August 2, 2010, and won the title of Miss Panamá Earth 2010.

She did not place.

References

External links
 Señorita Panamá  official website

1990 births
Living people
Señorita Panamá
Panamanian beauty pageant winners
Miss Earth 2010 contestants